Keith Gilroy (born 18 July 1983) is an Irish football coach and former professional footballer.

Career
His previous clubs include Sligo Rovers, Middlesbrough, and more recently Scarborough and Darlington.

After a short spell at Sligo Rovers, Gilroy made the step up to Middlesbrough where he failed to play a first team game. After being released, he joined Scarborough for a two-year spell before leaving in the summer of 2005 to play 2 games for Darlington, after and unsuccessful spell, he joined Burton Albion.

Gilroy signed a new two-year contract after promotion to the Football League, but injuries restricted his playing time before his release in May 2011.

Personal life

Following his release by Burton in 2011, Gilroy became a coach at the Derby County academy. He later started his own driving school, called 'Gilroy Driving'. In 2019, he returned to former club Burton Albion as a coach.

Honours
Conference National: 2009

References

External links

1983 births
Living people
Sligo Rovers F.C. players
League of Ireland players
Scarborough F.C. players
Darlington F.C. players
Burton Albion F.C. players
Republic of Ireland association footballers
Republic of Ireland youth international footballers
English Football League players
National League (English football) players
Association football midfielders